The Favorite or The Favourite may refer to:

 The Favorite (1935 film), an Argentine musical film
 The Favorite (1976 film), a two-part film based on the novel Dead Cert
 The Favorite (1989 film), a Swiss-American drama film
 The Favourite, a 2018 period black comedy film
 The Favorite (novel), a novel by Valentin Pikul, written in 1979-82
 "The Favourite" (song), a 1994 song by Directions In Groove
 The Favourite (pub), a pub in London

See also
 A Favorita, a 2008 Brazilian telenovela
 La Favorita or Stadio Renzo Barbera, a football stadium
 La Favorita (film), a 1952 Italian anthology film
 La favorite, an 1840 opera by Gaetano Donizetti
 La Favoritte, an early music ensemble